Seega is an abstract strategy game that originated in Egypt. It can be played on boards with cells in a 5×5, 7×7 or 9×9 disposition. Other names include Seejeh, Siga and Sidjah.

The board starts out empty, and players take turns placing two pieces in any empty cell, excluding the center cell. Then, players move their pieces trying to bound their opponent's pieces to remove them.

The game has been described in literature at least since 1836.

Rules
The game is played by two players, one with dark pieces and the other with clear pieces. Both start with the same number of pieces, equal to half the number of cells in the board minus one cell. Therefore, if the board has 25 cells, each player starts with 12 pieces. If the board has 49 cells, each player starts with 24 pieces. Some Seega boards have an X in the center cell.

Similarly to Yoté, the Seega board starts empty, and players may place their pieces wherever they want.

The game has two stages. In the first, the positioning stage, players place their pieces in the board cells, and cannot place any piece in the center cell. In each turn, each player places two pieces, until they have placed all their pieces. 

In the second stage, the moving stage, players move their pieces and capture their opponent's pieces. The first move of player 1 must be moving a piece to the center of the board. Pieces can be moved horizontally or vertically, never diagonally, and cannot jump over other pieces.

To capture a piece, a player must move one of their pieces in such way as to "bound" an opponent piece in one way (either vertically or horizontally). That is, if moving a dark piece results in a clear piece having a dark piece to its right and to its left (that is, the piece that has just been moved and another one), the clear piece will be removed. Same thing happens if the clear piece has a dark piece below and above it. If a player places one of its pieces between two opponent's pieces, nothing happens: captures only occur when a player bounds the pieces of the opponent.

After capturing an opponent's piece, the player can move again if that results in another capture.

Variants
There are many rules that describe what happen if a player can not move a piece. In one variant, the player can skip their turn, and their opponent plays again. In another, the player that can't make a move can make their opponent remove a piece that will allow the player to make a move. In another one, the player that can't make a move loses the game, except if it happens immediately after the first move of player one. That is, if after player 1 moves for the first time leaving player 2 with no moves, player 1 must remove one of its pieces adjacent to the cell which the first piece moved came from, so that player 2 can move. In another variant, it is player 2 that chooses which piece from player 1 will be removed.

In some versions, the game is over when one player has only one piece left. In others, the game is only over when one player has lost their final piece.

History

The book An Account Of The Manners And Customs Of The Modern Egyptians (1st edition from 1836) by Edward William Lane mentions the game. According to him, the 5×5 board is called "khamsáwee seega", the 7×7 board is called "seb'áwee", and the 9×9 board is called "tisáwee". The first move of each player is predetermined, as described in the image. The board and game of Seega must not be confused with the board and game called "táb" (also called "Seega") which has four rows of nine to fifteen cells, and is also described by Lane.

Another mention of the game is from an 1890 paper published in the Journal of American Folklore. In the paper, H. Carrington Bolton says he was camping by Mount Sinai and saw Egyptians and bedouins playing in holes dug in the sand. Bolton describes variants with 5×5, 7×7 and 9×9 cells. According to him, the game was called "seegà", and the pieces "kelb".

See also
 Senet

References

External links
 

Board games
Mathematical games
Egyptian culture